Belenkoye is a rural locality (a selo) in Laptevsky Selsoviet, Uglovsky District, Altai Krai, Russia. The population was 267 as of 2013. It was founded in 1860. There are 2 streets.

Geography 
Belenkoye is located 66 km south of Uglovskoye (the district's administrative centre) by road. Topolnoye is the nearest rural locality.

References 

Rural localities in Uglovsky District, Altai Krai